Aşk-ı Memnu is a Turkish romance novel by Halit Ziya Uşaklıgil. It was serialized in 1899 and 1900 in Servet-i Fünun, a leading Turkish literary magazine of the time.

Adaptations
Aşk-ı Memnu was adapted by Halit Refiğ into a TV series in 1975, considered to be the first miniseries on Turkish television. Another TV series adaptation named Aşk-ı Memnu aired from 2008 to 2010. It takes place in the modern-day Istanbul instead of the novel's late 19th-century setting. Telemundo produced a Spanish adaptation of the serial, Pasión prohibida, which was set in Miami.

The novel was made into a 3-act play by Tarık Günersel, who also wrote a libretto for the Turkish composer Selman Ada leading to an opera.

References

1900 novels
Turkish novels
Novels first published in serial form
Works originally published in Turkish magazines
Works originally published in literary magazines
Novels set in Istanbul